Brück is a town in the Potsdam-Mittelmark district, in Brandenburg, Germany. It is situated 29 km southwest of Potsdam, and 28 km southeast of Brandenburg. Parts of Brück are located in the High Fläming Nature Park.

At Brück, there is an aerial test facility with two 54-metre tall metal-free wooden towers.

Demography

Sons and daughters of the city

 Franz Griesbach (1892-1984), Generalmajor of the Wehrmacht in the Second World War
 Lothar Koch (born 1943), district administrator

References

External links

Localities in Potsdam-Mittelmark
Fläming Heath